This is a list of  63 state parks and recreation areas in Iowa. These state parks of the U.S. state of Iowa can be split into two groups based on management.  The first group are those state parks managed by the Iowa Department of Natural Resources.  The second group are those state parks managed by the county in which they are found.

DNR-managed state parks

County-managed state parks 
The following state parks are managed by local county conservation boards:

See also 
 List of Iowa state forests
 List of Iowa State Preserves

References

External links 

 Iowa State Parks & Recreation Areas

 
State parks
Iowa state parks